, there were about 8,400 electric vehicles (including plug-in hybrid vehicles) in Iowa, equivalent to 0.2% of all vehicles in the state.

Government policy
, the state government offers tax rebates of up to $500 for electric vehicle purchases.

, the state government charges a $130 annual fee for electric vehicle registration.

Charging stations
, there were 296 public charging station locations with 619 charging ports in Iowa.

The Infrastructure Investment and Jobs Act, signed into law in November 2021, allocates  to charging stations in Iowa.

, the state government has plans to build "alternative fuel corridors", with charging stations located every , along I-29, I-35, I-80, and I-380.

By region

Ames
, there were 12 public charging stations in Ames.

Cedar Rapids
, there were 16 public charging stations in Cedar Rapids.

Des Moines
, there were about 1,900 electric vehicles registered in Polk County.

, there were 39 public charging stations in Des Moines.

In June 2022, Polk County announced plans to introduce the first electric vehicles to the county fleet within 12 months.

Dubuque
, there were no electric vehicles in the Dubuque municipal fleet.

Iowa City
, there were 883 electric vehicles registered in Johnson County.

, there were 33 public charging stations in Iowa City and Coralville combined.

Quad Cities
, there were 11 public charging stations in Davenport.

Sioux City
, there were two public charging stations in Sioux City.

References

Iowa
Road transportation in Iowa